M. americanum  may refer to:

 Malacosoma americanum, the eastern tent caterpillar, a moth species that forms communal nests in the branches of trees
 Mammut americanum, the American mastodon, an extinct North American mammal species that lived from about 3.7 million years ago until about 10,000 years BC
 Megatherium americanum, an extinct ground sloth species endemic to Central and South America that lived from the Pliocene through Pleistocene
 Mezium americanum, the American spider beetle, a scavenger insect species found in various locations around the world